Thomas Bartlett Jr. (June 18, 1808 – September 12, 1876) was an American lawyer and politician. He served as a U.S. Representative from Vermont.

Biography
Bartlett was born in Sutton, Vermont, and attended the common schools. He studied law under Isaac Fletcher at the same time as Thomas J. D. Fuller, and was admitted to the bar in 1833. He began the practice of law in Groton, Vermont. In 1836 he moved to Lyndon, Vermont, where he continued to practice law.

From 1839 until 1842, Bartlett served as the State's attorney for Caledonia County. He was a member of the Vermont State Senate in 1841 and 1842, and served in the Vermont House of Representatives in 1849, 1850, 1854 and 1855. Bartlett was a delegate to the State constitutional conventions in 1850 and 1857, and was President of the Vermont Constitutional Convention in 1850.

Bartlett was elected as a Democrat to the Thirty-second Congress, serving from March 4, 1851 until March 3, 1853. In Congress, he served as chairman of the Committee on Expenditures on Public Buildings. He was an unsuccessful candidate for reelection in 1852. After leaving Congress, Bartlett resumed the practice of law.

In 1851, Bartlett aired his dismay for the current behavior of college students in a letter that appeared in the July 19, 1851 edition of the Caledonian, a newspaper printed at St. Johnsbury, VT. The letter then became a pamphlet entitled "An Epistolary Disquisition on College Morality." His main complaint was what he felt was the loose language of college students. He had sent the letter to the editor outlining his complaints and the pamphlet, written just before his induction to the 32nd Congress, was written to justify his earlier criticisms. A pamphlet mocking Bartlett for his criticisms of "the shockingly profane and obscene" language he complains of was circulated in late 1851 with Barlett's letter printed intact and a mocking rebuke of the letter and its author following.

Death
Bartlett died on September 12, 1876 in Lyndon, Vermont. He is interred in Lyndon Town Cemetery in Lyndon.

References

External links 
 Biographical Directory of the United States Congress: BARTLETT, Thomas, Jr., (1808 - 1876)
 Govtrack.us: Lucius Benedict Peck
 The Political Graveyard: Bartlett, Thomas, Jr. (1808-1876)

1808 births
1876 deaths
People from Caledonia County, Vermont
Democratic Party members of the United States House of Representatives from Vermont
Democratic Party members of the Vermont House of Representatives
Democratic Party Vermont state senators
State's attorneys in Vermont
Vermont lawyers
American lawyers admitted to the practice of law by reading law
19th-century American politicians
19th-century American lawyers
Burials in Vermont